Penns Neck is a cape, or headland, extending into the Delaware River and is located in Pennsville Township, Salem County, New Jersey. The area was named after William Penn.

See also
 Finns Point

References

Pennsville Township, New Jersey
Landforms of Salem County, New Jersey